Sama Malolo (born 19 February 1998) is an Australian rugby union player who plays for the San Diego Legion of Major League Rugby (MLR). His position of choice is hooker.

He also played for the Utah Warriors in the MLR.

References

Super Rugby statistics

1998 births
Australian rugby union players
Australian sportspeople of Samoan descent
Melbourne Rebels players
Rugby union hookers
Living people
Perth Spirit players
Australian expatriate rugby union players
Expatriate rugby union players in Japan
Tokyo Sungoliath players
Expatriate rugby union players in the United States
Utah Warriors players
San Diego Legion players